Guyuefeng Town, is an urban town in Zhuzhou County, Zhuzhou City, Hunan Province, People's Republic of China.

Cityscape
The town is divided into 19 villages and one community, the following areas: Tangyuan'ao Community, Xiangyang Village, Sanwang Village, Hongyi Village, Hengtang Village, Shitang Village, Dijia Village, Jintai Village, Youyi Village, Liaojia Village, Hetai Village, Zhaoshan Village, Jinpan Village, Baibi Village, Changshan Village, Rougongci Village, Yuefeng Village, Batang Village, Lishuping Village, and Yaotang Village.

References

External links

Divisions of Zhuzhou County